Sepp Daxenberger (10 April 1962 – 18 August 2010) was a German Green Party politician.

Biography
Daxenberger was born in Waging am See in Bavaria. He became a blacksmith and later he owned and worked at a farm close to Waging. In 1990 he was elected as a member of the  Landtag of Bavaria, serving until 1996. From 1998 until 2003 he was member of the regional parliament of Upper Bavaria.

In 1996, Daxenberger was elected as mayor of Waging am See - he was the first mayor in Bavaria from the Green Party. Daxenberger was the chairman of the Green Party in Bavaria between 2002 and 2008. For the 2008 Bavaria state election he was nominated as the front runner of his party and became Parliamentary group leader after the election, in which the Green Party received 7.7% of the vote.

Daxenberger was diagnosed with cancer in 2003; his condition worsened in 2009. He died of cancer in Traunstein on 18 August 2010. His wife, who was also ill with cancer, died of the disease three days before him.

External links 
 

1962 births
2010 deaths
People from Traunstein (district)
Alliance 90/The Greens politicians
Members of the Landtag of Bavaria
Deaths from bone cancer
Deaths from cancer in Germany
Mayors of places in Bavaria